Fellows of the Royal Society elected in 2006.

Fellows 

Roger William Alder
David Barford
Stephen M. Barnett
Allan Basbaum
Richard William Battarbee
Axel Dieter Becke
Valerie Beral
Edmund John Philip Browne
Peter James Donnelly
John Hugh David Eland
David John Ewins
David Malcolm Farmer
Marc Feldmann
Charles Thomas Bayley Foxon
Matthew John Aylmer Freeman
Karl John Friston
Nigel David Forster Grindley
Andy Hopper
Peter John Hunter
Richard James Jackson
Richard A. Jones
Calestous Juma
Michael Lockwood
Ruth Marion Lynden-Bell
Trudy Frances Charlene Mackay
Jerrold Eldon Marsden
Robert Anthony Martienssen
Ramesh Narayan
Raymond William Ogden
Peter Joseph Jacques Parker
John Martindale Pearce
Joseph Sriyal Malik Peiris
Michael Richard Edward Proctor
Atta ur Rahman
Helen Ruth Saibil
Nicholas Shepherd-Barron
Austin Gerard Smith
Nahum Sonenberg
Mriganka Sur
Peter Christopher West
Nicholas John White
Alan Geoffrey Wilson
David Phillip Woodruff
Ziheng Yang

Foreign members

Kenneth Joseph Arrow
Edouard Brézin
Paul Josef Crutzen
Daan Frenkel
Roger Y. Tsien
Carl Richard Woese

Honorary fellow 
Ralph Kohn

References

2006
2006 in science
2006 in the United Kingdom